Normal yield is an agricultural term referring to the average historic yield established for a particular farm or area. It is also used to describe average yields. Normal production would be the normal crop acreage planted multiplied by the normal yield. These measures, once required by commodity programs to calculate benefits, are replaced by base acres, payment acres, and payment yield under the 2002 farm bill (P.L. 101-171, Sec. 1101-1102).

References 

Farm Security and Rural Investment Act of 2002
Agricultural economics